Gregory Bar Hebraeus (b. 1226 - d. 30 July 1286), known by his Syriac ancestral surname as Bar Ebraya or Bar Ebroyo, and also by a Latinized name Abulpharagius, was a Maphrian (regional primate) of the Syriac Orthodox Church from 1264 to 1286. He was a prominent writer, who created various works in the fields of Christian theology, philosophy, history, linguistics, and poetry. For his contributions to the development of Syriac literature, has been praised as one of the most learned and versatile writers among Syriac Orthodox Christians.

In his numerous and elaborate treatises, he collected as much contemporary knowledge in theology, philosophy, science and history as was possible in 13th century Syria. Most of his works were written in Classical Syriac language. He also wrote some in Arabic, which was the common language in his day.

Name
It is not clear when Bar Hebraeus adopted  the Christian name Gregory ( Grigorios), but according to the Syriac Orthodox tradition of naming high priests, it may have occurred at the time of his consecration as bishop. Throughout his life, he was often referred to by the Syriac nickname Bar ʿEvrāyā (which is pronounced and often transliterated as Bar Ebroyo in the Western Syriac Rite of the Syriac Orthodox Church, giving rise to the Latinised name Bar Hebraeus. It was previously thought that this name, which means "Son of the Hebrew", was a reference to his Jewish background. Modern scholarship has moved away from this affirmation, because it is not substantiated by other facts. The name may refer to the ancestral origin of his family from ʿEbrā, a village by the Euphrates near Malatya, the city in which he grew up. However, all references to this longer name are posthumous. The Syriac nickname Bar ʿEbrāyā is sometimes arabised as ibn al-ʿIbrī. E. A. W. Budge says Bar Hebraeus was given the baptismal name John, but this may be a scribal error. As a Syriac bishop, Bar Hebraeus is often given the honorific Mār (pronounced Mor in West Syriac dialect), and thus Mar/Mor Gregory. He is also known as Abu'l Faraj (in Latin, Abulpharagius).

Life

A Syriac bishop, philosopher, poet, grammarian, physician, biblical commentator, historian, and theologian, Bar Hebraeus was the son of a Jewish physician, Aaron. Bar Hebraeus was born in the village of ʿEbra (Izoli, Turk.: Kuşsarayı) near Malatya, Sultanate of Rum (now Turkey, in the province of Elazığ). Under the care of his father, he began as a boy (a teneris unguiculis) the study of medicine and of many other branches of knowledge, which he never abandoned.

A Mongol general invaded the area of Malatya, and falling ill, sought for a physician. Aaron, the Hebrew physician, was summoned. Upon his recovery, the Mongol general and Aaron, who took his family with him, went to Antioch. There Bar Hebraeus continued with his studies and when he was about seventeen years of age he became a monk and began to lead the life of the hermit.

From Antioch Bar Hebraeus went to Tripoli in Phoenicia, and studied rhetoric and medicine. In 1246, he was consecrated bishop of Gubos by the Syriac Orthodox Patriarch Ignatius II, and in 1252 he was transferred to Aleppo. In 1255 was transferred to the see of Laqabin and finally was made primate, or maphrian, of the East by Ignatius IV Yeshu in 1264. His episcopal duties did not interfere with his studies; he took advantage of the numerous visitations, which he had to make throughout his vast province, to consult the libraries and converse with the learned men whom he happened to meet. Thus he gradually accumulated an immense erudition, became familiar with almost all branches of secular and religious knowledge, and in many cases thoroughly mastered the bibliography of the various subjects which he undertook to treat. Bar Hebræus preserved and systematized the work of his predecessors, either by way of condensation or by way of direct reproduction. Both on account of his virtues and of his science, Bar Hebræus was highly esteemed. He died in Maragheh, Ilkhanate Persia, and was buried at the Mor Mattai Monastery, near Mosul. He left an autobiography, to be found in Giuseppe Simone Assemani, Biblioth. Orient., II, 248–263; the account of his death was written by his brother, the maphrian Gregory III (Grigorius bar Saumo) (d. 1307/8).

Works

Encyclopedic and philosophical
Bar Hebraeus' great encyclopedic work is his Hewath Hekhmetha, "The Cream of Science", which deals with almost every branch of human knowledge, and comprises the whole Aristotelian discipline, after Avicenna and Arabian writers. This work, so far, has not been published, with the exception of one chapter, by Margoliouth, in Analecta Orientalia ad poeticam Aristoteleam (London, 1887), 114–139.

The Kethabha dhe-Bhabhatha ("Book of the Pupils of the Eyes") is a compendium of logic and dialectics. Other works are to be found in various manuscripts, preserved at Florence, Oxford, London, and elsewhere. The Teghrath Teghratha ("Commerce of Commerces") is a résumé of the preceding, while Kethabha dhe-Sewadh Sophia ("Book of Speech of Wisdom") represents a compendium of knowledge in physics and metaphysics. To these should be added a few translations of Arabic works into Syriac, as well as some treatises written in Arabic.

Biblical
The most important work of Bar Hebraeus is Awsar Raze, "Storehouse of Secrets", a commentary on the entire Bible, both doctrinal and critical. Before giving his doctrinal exposition of a passage, he first considers its critical state. Although he uses the Peshitta as a basis, he knows that it is not perfect, and therefore controls it by the Hebrew, the Septuagint, the Greek versions of Symmachus, Theodotion, Aquila, by Oriental versions, Armenian and Coptic, and finally by the other Syriac translations, Heraclean, Philoxenian and especially the Syro-Hexapla. The work of Bar Hebræus is of prime importance for the recovery of these versions and more specially for the Hexapla of Origen, of which the Syro-Hexapla is a translation by Paul of Tella. His exegetical and doctrinal portions are taken from the Greek Fathers and previous Syriac Orthodox theologians. No complete edition of the work has yet been issued, but many individual books have been published at different times.

Historical
Bar Hebraeus has left a large ecclesiastical history called Makhtbhanuth Zabhne (Chronicon), in which he considers history from the Creation down to his own day. Bar Hebræus used almost all that had been written before him, showing particular favor to the now lost chronographic records published by Theophilus of Edessa (late 8th century, although he has this only through Michael the Syrian and other dependents). The work is divided into two portions, often transmitted separately.

The first portion deals with political and civil history and is known as the Chronicon Syriacum.  The standard edition of the Chronicon Syriacum is that of Paul Bedjan. An English translation by E. A. Wallis Budge was published in 1932.

This was to give context to the second portion, known as the Chronicon Ecclesiasticum and covering the religious history. That section begins with Aaron and consists of a series of entries of important individuals.  The first half covers the history of the Syriac Orthodox Church and the Patriarchs of Antioch, while the second half is devoted to the Church of the East, the Nestorian Patriarchs, and the Jacobite Maphrians. The current edition of the Chronicon Ecclesiasticum is that of Abbeloos and Lamy, Syriac text, Latin translation. An English translation by David Wilmshurst was published in 2016.

Bar Hebraeus towards the end of his life decided to write a history in Arabic largely based on the Chronicon Syriacum, adapted for a wider Arabic-reading readership rather than solely for Syriac-literate clergy. The work became known under the name al-Mukhtaṣar fi-l-Duwal. This was first published by Edward Pococke in 1663 with Latin comments and translation. A modern edition was first published by Fr. Anton Salhani in 1890.

Theological
In theology Bar Hebræus was a Miaphysite. He once mused: When I had given much thought and pondered on the matter, I became convinced that these quarrels among the different Christian Churches are not a matter of factual substance, but of words and terminology; for they all confess Christ our Lord to be perfect God and perfect human, without any commingling, mixing, or confusion of the natures... Thus I saw all the Christian communities, with their different christological positions, as possessing a single common ground that is without any difference between them.

In this field, we have from Bar Hebraeus Menarath Qudhshe, "Lamp of the Sanctuary", and the Kethabha dhe-Zalge, "Book of Rays", a summary of the first. These works have not been published, and exist in manuscript in Paris, Berlin, London, Oxford, and Rome. Ascetical and moral theology were also treated by Bar Hebræus, and we have from him Kethabha dhe-Ithiqon, "Book of Ethics", and Kethabha dhe-Yauna, "Book of the Dove", an ascetical guide. Both have been edited by Bedjan in "Ethicon seu Moralia Gregorii Barhebræi" (Paris and Leipzig, 1898). The "Book of the Dove" was issued simultaneously by Cardahi (Rome, 1898). Bar Hebræus codified the juridical texts of the Syriac Orthodox, in a collection called Kethabha dhe-Hudhaye, "Book of Directions", edited by Bedjan, "Barhebræi Nomocanon" (Paris, 1898). A Latin translation is to be found in Angelo Mai, "Scriptorum Veter. Nova Collectio", vol. x.

Linguistic
Linguistic works of Gregory Bar Hebraeus resulted from his studies of Syriac language and Syriac literature. He wrote two major grammatical works. First is the "Book of grammar in the meter of Mor Ephrem", also known as the "Metrical Grammar", written in verses with commentaries, and extant in some 140 copies from various periods. In that work, he referred to his native language both as Aramaic (ārāmāytā) and Syriac (sûryāyā). His other grammatical work is called the "Book of Splendours" (Ktābā d-ṣemḥe). Both were edited by Paulin Martin in 1872.

Other works
Beside previously mentioned, Bar Hebræus has left many other works on mathematics, astronomy, cosmography, medicine and philosophy, some of which have been published, but others exist only in manuscripts. The more important of them are:
 Kethabha dhe-Bhabhatha (Book of the Pupils of the Eyes), a treatise on logic or dialectics
 Hewath Hekmetha (Butter of Wisdom), an exposition of the whole philosophy of Aristotle
 Sullarat Haunãnãyã (Ascent of the Mind), a treatise on astronomy and cosmography, edited and translated by F. Nau (Paris, 1899)
 various medical works
 Kethabha dhe-Zalge (Book of Rays), a treatise on grammar
 ethical works
 poems
 Kethabha dhe-Thunnaye Mghahkhane (Book of Entertaining Stories), edited and translated by E. A. Wallis Budge (London, 1897).

A full list of Bar Hebraeus's other works, and of editions of such of them as have been published, can be found in several scholarly works.

Veneration
He is regarded as a saint by the Syriac Orthodox Church, who hold his feast day on July 30.

References

Sources

 
 
 
 
 
 
 
 
 
 
 
 
 
 
 
 
 
  (PDF version)

External links

 Introduction of: Ernest A. Wallis Budge, The Chronography of Gregory Abû’l Faraj, the Son of Aaron, the Hebrew Physician, Commonly known as Bar Hebraeus, London: Oxford University Press, 1932.
 Gregorii Barhebraei Chronicon ecclesiasticum: quod e codice Musei britannici descriptum conjuncta opera ediderunt, Latinitate donarunt annotationibusque ...illustrarunt Jean Baptiste Abbeloos, Thomas Joseph Lamy  Also at Archive.org here.
 Gregorii Bar-Hebraei Scholia in Psalmum LXVIII. e codicibus mss. syriacis Bibliothecae Florentinae et Clementino-Vaticanae et Bodleianae Oxoniensis primum edita et annotationibus illustrata, Vratislaviae 1852.
 The Laughable Stories of Bar-Hebraeus, 1897 tr. by E.A.W. Budge, at sacred-texts

Maphrians
Syriac Orthodox Church saints
Christian anti-Gnosticism
Syriac writers
Syriacists
Orthodox Christian Chroniclers
13th-century historians of the medieval Islamic world
1226 births
1286 deaths
13th-century Christian saints
Burials in Iraq
13th-century Oriental Orthodox archbishops
Syrian people of Jewish descent
Syrian Oriental Orthodox Christians
Syrian archbishops
13th-century Syriac Orthodox Church bishops